Diplodonta semiaspera, or the pimpled diplodon, is a species of bivalve mollusc in the family Ungulinidae. It can be found in Caribbean waters, ranging from southern Florida to the West Indies.

References

Ungulinidae
Bivalves described in 1836